KSBY (channel 6) is a television station licensed to San Luis Obispo, California, United States, serving the Central Coast of California as an affiliate of NBC and The CW Plus. The station is owned by the E.W. Scripps Company, and maintains studios on Calle Joaquin in southern San Luis Obispo, with an additional studio on Skyway Drive in Santa Maria, near the Santa Maria Public Airport. Its transmitter is located atop Cuesta Peak.

History
The station went on the air in May 1953, as KVEC-TV. The VEC stood for Valley Electric Company, which also built Sonic Cable, the original cable television system in San Luis Obispo. KVEC-TV was the first television station in the Central and South Coast, and aired programming from NBC, ABC, CBS, and DuMont, with NBC being its primary affiliation. During its first four years on the air, the station was co-owned with radio station KVEC.

Ownership with KSBW
From 1957 to 1996, the station was a sister station to KSBW channel 8 in Salinas, which is why the station currently has a similar call sign. From 1957 to 1979, KSBY was largely a semi-satellite of KSBW, with the exception of local commercials, its local newscasts, some syndicated programs, and preempting CBS network shows also carried by KCOY in adjacent Santa Maria, once it began operation in 1964. During this period, the KSBY sales office was located at co-owned Sonic Cable, and its local programming originated at the transmitter site. In 1960, ABC programming was effectively dropped when KSBW lost its affiliation with that network to KNTV in San Jose. Finally, in 1969, KSBY became the sole NBC station for both San Luis Obispo and Santa Barbara counties when they were consolidated into a single market (with Santa Barbara-based KEYT as the ABC affiliate). KSBY and KSBW were acquired by Blair Broadcasting in 1979, at which time KSBY became a free-standing station. The stations were sold to Gillett Communications in 1986.

Ownership changes
After Gillett restructured into SCI TV in the early 1990s, it sold KSBY and KSBW to EP Communications in 1994. EP, in turn, sold both stations to Smith Broadcasting in 1995. Almost immediately, KSBY was spun off to SJL Broadcasting in 1996, because Smith Broadcasting already owned rival station KEYT, and Federal Communications Commission (FCC) rules of the time did not permit duopolies. Even today, common ownership of KEYT and KSBY would be a violation of FCC duopoly rules, which forbid one entity to directly own two of the four largest stations in a single media market.

In September 2002, SJL sold KSBY to the second incarnation of New Vision Television, a company partially related to the most recent incarnation of that company that sold all of its stations to LIN Media in 2012. Evening Post Industries (through its Cordillera Communications subsidiary) acquired the station in 2004.

Recent history

In 2006, the station was featured in an episode of The Surreal Life, in which the cast of the reality-based series were hired as anchors and reporters for the station's 6:30 p.m. newscast.

Ryan Bennett, a one time KSBY sports anchor from 1999 to 2006, died on May 31, 2006, in Utah in an accident.

Cordillera announced on October 29, 2018, it will sell most of its stations, including KSBY, to the E. W. Scripps Company. The sale was completed on May 1, 2019. This made KSBY a sister station to nearby ABC affiliates KERO-TV in Bakersfield and KGTV in San Diego.

Central Coast CW (KSBY-DT2)
KSBY-DT2 is the CW-affiliated second digital subchannel of KSBY, broadcasting in 720p high definition on channel 6.2. All programming on KSBY-DT2 is received through The CW's programming feed for smaller media markets, The CW Plus, which provides a set schedule of syndicated programming acquired by The CW for broadcast during time periods outside of the network's regular programming hours; however, Scripps handles local advertising and promotional services for the subchannel. KSBY-DT2 carries the entire CW network schedule, although it preempts a half-hour of syndicated programming carried by the CW Plus source feed (usually consisting of off-network sitcoms) each night in order to carry a 10:00 p.m. newscast produced by its parent station.

News operation
, KSBY airs 36 hours of news each week (with 6 hours each weekday and 90 minutes each on Saturdays and Sundays). Until June 2021, KSBY did not broadcast news during the midday hours but on June 21, 2021, KSBY debuted a new half-hour newscast at 11 a.m. called KSBY News Midday. However, KSBY still does not have weekend morning newscasts.  On KSBY-DT2, the station airs a half-hour primetime newscast at 10 p.m. seven days a week.

Technical information

Subchannels
The station's digital signal is multiplexed:

Analog-to-digital conversion
KSBY shut down its analog signal, over VHF channel 6, on February 17, 2009, the original target date on which full-power television stations in the United States were to transition from analog to digital broadcasts under a federal mandate (which was later pushed back to June 12, 2009). The station's digital signal remained on its pre-transition UHF channel 15. Through the use of PSIP, digital television receivers display the station's virtual channel as its former VHF analog channel 6.

Translator

A translator was previously operated in Springville on K11FU, owned by Springville Community TV, but the station's license was cancelled in December 2007. KSBY can be received in parts of Ventura County near the Los Angeles area covered by NBC West Coast flagship KNBC and Monterey County south of San Jose in the San Francisco Bay Area covered by NBC O&O KNTV. Sometimes KSBY can be received in the southern San Joaquin Valley like in parts of Fresno, Tulare and Kern counties.

See also
Channel 5 branded TV stations in the United States
Channel 6 virtual TV stations in the United States
Channel 15 digital TV stations in the United States
KVEC (AM)

References

External links
 
  — Central Coast CW 5 site

NBC network affiliates
Laff (TV network) affiliates
Court TV affiliates
Television channels and stations established in 1953
1953 establishments in California
SBY
E. W. Scripps Company television stations